Amphimedon is a genus of sponges with over 60 described species. In 2009, Amphimedon queenslandica was the first species of sponge to have its genome sequenced.

Species
The following species are recognised in the genus Amphimedon:

References 

Sponge genera
Haplosclerina